Shoeless Joe is a 1982 magic realist novel by Canadian author W. P. Kinsella that was later adapted into the 1989 film Field of Dreams, which was nominated for three Academy Awards. 

The novel was expanded from Kinsella's short story "Shoeless Joe Jackson Comes to Iowa", first published in his 1980 collection of the same name. Kinsella first developed the idea for the story while attending the Iowa Writers' Workshop, and decided to incorporate the stories he told about the Black Sox Scandal, imagining if Shoeless Joe Jackson came back to the same city Kinsella was living in, Iowa City.

Plot
Ray Kinsella lives and farms in Iowa where he grows corn with his wife Annie and their five-year-old daughter Karin. Kinsella is obsessed with the beauty and history of American baseball, specifically the plight of his hero, Shoeless Joe Jackson, and the Black Sox Scandal of the 1919 World Series. When he hears a voice telling him to build a baseball field in the midst of his corn crop in order to give his hero a chance at redemption, he blindly follows instructions. The field becomes a conduit to the spirits of baseball legends. Soon, Kinsella is off on a cross-country trip to ease the pain of another hero, the reclusive writer J.D. Salinger, as part of a journey the Philadelphia Inquirer called "not so much about baseball as it's about dreams, magic, life, and what is quintessentially American."

Characters

Main
Ray Kinsella, protagonist and devoted baseball fan
Annie Kinsella, wife of Ray
Karin Kinsella, 5-year-old daughter of Ray and Annie

Supporting
Richard Kinsella, Identical twin brother of Ray
"Gypsy", Richard's girlfriend
Mark, Annie's brother and Ray's brother-in-law
Abner Bluestein, Mark's business partner and accomplice
Eddie Scissons, originally owned Ray's farm and was locally known as the oldest living Chicago Cub

Historical/real life
Shoeless Joe Jackson, baseball player
J. D. Salinger, reclusive author of The Catcher in the Rye and "A Young Girl in 1941 with No Waist at All", which are referred to in the book
Moonlight Graham, baseball player and later a doctor in the small town of Chisholm, Minnesota

Awards and nominations
Shoeless Joe was the winner of the 1982 Books in Canada First Novel Award and a Houghton Mifflin Literary Fellowship. In 2011, the Canadian Baseball Hall of Fame awarded Kinsella the Jack Graney Award for a significant contribution to the game of baseball in Canada through a life's work or a singular outstanding achievement.

Film adaptation
Shoeless Joe was later adapted into the 1989 film Field of Dreams by Phil Alden Robinson. The original working title of the film was Shoeless Joe, like the book. The original title of the book was Dream Field, but the publisher renamed it Shoeless Joe.

J.D. Salinger
W.P. Kinsella, who had never met Salinger, created a wholly imagined character (aside from his being a recluse) based on the author of The Catcher in the Rye, a book that had great meaning to him when he was a young man. To get a feel for Salinger, he re-read his body of work.

"I made sure to make him a nice character so that he couldn't sue me."

In addition to having a character named "Ray Kinsella" in the short story "A Young Girl in 1941 with No Waist at All", Salinger had also used the surname in The Catcher in the Rye (Holden Caulfield's friend Richard Kinsella).

Known for his litigiousness, Salinger contacted Kinsella's publisher via his attorneys to express outrage over having been portrayed in Shoeless Joe and intimated he would sue should the character "J.D. Salinger" appear in any other medium, should Shoeless Joe be adapted.

In the novel Shoeless Joe, Ray Kinsella seeks out J. D. Salinger, although in the film this character was renamed Terence Mann (and was changed to a black man by the casting of James Earl Jones) as the movie producers were worried over being sued by Salinger. The producers believed that it was not significant to jettison Salinger, as they figured only 15% of the potential audience would know who the author was. Kinsella told Maclean's Magazine in a 2010 interview on the death of Salinger that many of the book's readers believe that Salinger is a wholly fictional character.

Kinsella denied that Salinger, as a writer, had any particular influence on his own writing.

Release details

1982, United States, Houghton Mifflin , Pub. date April 12, 1982, (Paperback)
1999, United States, Mariner Books , Pub. date April 28, 1999, Paperback

References

1982 Canadian novels
Baseball novels
Canadian magic realism novels
Canadian novels adapted into films
Cultural depictions of Shoeless Joe Jackson
Farms in fiction
Ghost novels
Houghton Mifflin books
J. D. Salinger
Novels by W. P. Kinsella
Novels set in Iowa